Dinaelurus is a genus of the Nimravidae, an extinct family of feliform mammalian carnivores, also known as "false saber-toothed cats".

Taxonomy
Dinaelurus was named by George Francis Eaton (1922). Its type is Dinaelurus crassus. It was assigned to Nimravinae by Flynn and Galiano (1982) and Bryant (1991); and to Nimravidae by Eaton (1922) and Larry D. Martin (1998).

Fossil distribution
One specimen was found in the John Day Formation in Oregon and was described by Eaton in 1922.

Description
Dinaelurus had a skull extremely broad for its length and had conical teeth; it could exhibit little or no development of sabertooth features and had more rounded cheek teeth with no serrated ridges. It had a relatively gracile skeleton. Martin hypothesizes that it had digitigrade feet.

Behavior
It is believed that Dinaelurus was a cursorial predator, meaning it ran down its prey. This is suggested by the nimravid's short face and large nostrils, similar to those of a cheetah, which is also a cursorial predator, as Martin suggests.

Sources 

 https://web.archive.org/web/20080620030107/http://home.earthlink.net/~ratha13/id5.html
 https://archive.today/20130201060334/http://www.rathascourage.com/research.html

Nimravidae
Oligocene feliforms
Aquitanian genus extinctions
Oligocene mammals of North America
Prehistoric carnivoran genera